Cadot is a surname. Notable people with the surname include: 

 Albert Cadot (1901–1972), French sailor
 J. R. Cadot (born 1987), Bahamian basketball player
 Jérémy Cadot (born 1986), French fencer
 Laurent Cadot (born 1983), French rower

See also
 Gadot (surname)